Michael Bryan may refer to:

 Mike Bryan (born 1978), American tennis player
 Michael Bryan (art historian) (1757–1821), English art historian
 Mike Bryan (musician) (1916–1972), American jazz guitarist
 Michael Bryan (footballer) (born 1990), English footballer